Torrella is a genus of operculate land snails, terrestrial gastropod mollusks in the family Pomatiidae.

Distribution 
The distribution of the genus Torrella includes Cuba.

Species 
Species in the genus Torrella include:
Torrella deficiens (Gundlach in Pfeiffer, 1857)
Torrella immersa (Gundlach in Pfeiffer, 1857)
Torrella simpsoni Gundlach in Pfeiffer, 1920

References

Pomatiidae